Ajit Singh Sarhadi (1905-1979) was an Indian politician. He was elected to the Lok Sabha, lower house of the Parliament of India as a member of the Indian National Congress.

References

External links
 Official biographical sketch in Parliament of India website

India MPs 1957–1962
Lok Sabha members from Punjab, India
Indian National Congress politicians
1905 births
Year of death missing